Fraser is the name of two places in the State of New York in the United States of America:

Fraser, Delaware County, New York
Fraser, Livingston County, New York